Tebanicline (ebanicline, ABT-594) is a potent synthetic nicotinic (non-opioid) analgesic drug developed by Abbott. It was developed as a less toxic analog of the potent poison dart frog-derived compound epibatidine, which is about 200 times stronger than morphine as an analgesic, but produces extremely dangerous toxic side effects. Like epibatidine, tebanicline showed potent analgesic activity against neuropathic pain in both animal and human trials, but with far less toxicity than its parent compound. It acts as a partial agonist at neuronal nicotinic acetylcholine receptors, binding to both the α3β4 and the α4β2 subtypes.

Tebanicline progressed to Phase II clinical trials in humans, but was dropped from further development due to unacceptable incidence of gastrointestinal side effects. However, further research in this area is ongoing, and the development of nicotinic acetylcholine receptor agonists is ongoing. No agents from this class have successfully completed human clinical trials due to their unacceptable side effect profiles.  Research in the area continues.

References 

Analgesics
Pyridines
Nicotinic agonists
Stimulants
Chloroarenes
Phenol ethers
Azetidines